In enzymology, a 3-hydroxyanthranilate 4-C-methyltransferase is an enzyme that catalyzes the chemical reaction

S-adenosyl-L-methionine + 3-hydroxyanthranilate  S-adenosyl-L-homocysteine + 3-hydroxy-4-methylanthranilate

Thus, the two substrates of this enzyme are S-adenosyl methionine and 3-hydroxyanthranilate, whereas its two products are S-adenosylhomocysteine and 3-hydroxy-4-methylanthranilate.

This enzyme belongs to the family of transferases, specifically those transferring one-carbon group methyltransferases.  The systematic name of this enzyme class is S-adenosyl-L-methionine:3-hydroxyanthranilate 4-C-methyltransferase. This enzyme is also called 3-hydroxyanthranilate 4-methyltransferase.

References

 

EC 2.1.1
Enzymes of unknown structure